USS Moonstone (PYc-9) was a coastal patrol yacht in the service of the United States Navy. She was built in 1929 as Nancy Baker by Germaniawerft in Kiel, Germany, later renamed Mona, and subsequently acquired by the Navy as the Lone Star on 10 February 1941. Renamed Moonstone and designated PYc-9, she was converted for U.S. Navy service in Jacksonville, Florida, and commissioned on 10 April 1941. She was named for the gemstone moonstone.

On 2 May 1941, Moonstone sailed for patrol duty with the Panamanian Sea Frontier. She later moved to Ecuador on 2 January 1943 to aid in training the Ecuadorian Navy. In March 1943 she sailed to Charleston, South Carolina, to prepare for permanent transfer to Ecuador. On her return at Balboa, Panama, in July 1943, cracks were discovered in the cylinder blocks of her engine, and she was sent north for repairs. On 16 October 1943, off the mouth of Delaware's Indian River she collided with the destroyer  and sank immediately. All but one of Moonstones'''s complement survived. She was struck from the Naval Register on 26 October 1943.

ReferencesThis article includes text from the public domain Dictionary of American Naval Fighting Ships.''

External links
 history.navy.mil: USS Moonstone
 navsource.org:  PYc-9 Moonstone
 Moonstone wreck diving information

Patrol vessels of the United States Navy
Patrol vessels of the United States
World War II patrol vessels of the United States
Shipwrecks of the New Jersey coast
Ships built in Kiel
Maritime incidents in October 1943
Ships sunk in collisions